In Japan, it is customary to serve alcoholic drinks with snacks called , , or . These are usually quite salty and served in relatively small portions. Sakana are usually more substantial than tapas, although they are not considered a meal since they are not accompanied by rice. Traditionally, the Japanese regarded sake, which is made from rice, as a substitute for white rice served in a standard Japanese meal, and as a result some Japanese do not eat rice and drink alcohol simultaneously.

Sakana are served in drinking establishments known as izakaya. When first seated in an izakaya, an otoshi (お通し) or appetizer is placed on the table before any drinks are ordered. This otoshi is covered in the otoshi fee or seating charge on the bill. Common otoshi include cabbage salad (often refilled free of charge), Japanese-style potato salad, tsukemono, and shiokara. Sakana are ordered throughout the time one is drinking and come to the table a few at a time. It is common to order a different kind of sakana as a shime, last dish. Shime are often softer dishes like noodles or sweeter dishes like tamagoyaki. 

It is common for sakana to also be served at home or in private when alcohol is consumed. There are a variety of cookbooks that give examples of sakana that are easy to prepare at home. Combini and other stores that sell alcohol often have a selection of pre-packaged dried snacks, canned items, and pickles designed to be consumed as sakana.

Sakana were originally designed to be paired with shochu or sake. Since the 19th century, the market share for Japanese beer has expanded in Japan. In 1959 beer overtook sake as the nation's most popular alcoholic beverage in taxable shipping volume, and at the same time various foods designed to accompany beer have become popular. There are also sakana designed to be paired with wine.

Sakana have embraced not only washoku, Japanese cuisine, but also yōshoku, western influenced dishes. It is not uncommon to encounter Naporitan or Italian style pasta, pizza, cheese, gyoza, kimchi, and namul in modern izakaya. Some of the most common sakana are actually yōshoku, including potato salad, korokke and other deep fried foods.

Etymology 

The term sakana traditionally refers to food served with sake, and originates from the words saka (sake) and na (side dish). Because dried fish and salted fish roe were popular choice for such dishes, over the years the term sakana also came to mean "fish."

Another word for "snack" in Japanese is .The Japanese noun tsumami meaning "something to nibble/eat with a drink", which is beautified by adding an honorific prefix o and becoming otsumami.; this term usually applies to smaller dishes. Otsumami are generally simpler dishes suited for otoshi (お通し) or preparing and eating at home. Since otoshi are placed on the table as customers sit down, they are usually dishes that can be prepared ahead of time in large portions and served cold or at room temperature. This makes them attractive to housewives who wish to prepare a variety of sakana ahead of time.

Ate (あて) or ategau (あてがう), meaning accompaniment is also sometimes used to refer to foods that go well with alcohol.

Types of sakana

When drinking at home sakana can be more modest. A bachelor or someone living alone might open a can of mackerel (sanma or saury) in miso or soy sauce or simply use a pre-packaged form of sakana like pickles or Japanese potato salad bought at a supermarket or convenience store. Certain sakana like kaki no tane are associated with bachelors or older men. 

Listed below are some common sakana.

 Yakitori - grilled skewers of chicken and chicken parts
 Kushiage - deep-fried skewers of meat or vegetables
 Sashimi - slices of raw fish
 Tsukemono - pickles
 Kimchi - spicy Korean cabbage

 Sakana especially popular with beer:
 Edamame - salted and boiled soybean pods
 Nankotsu (chicken cartilage) karaage
 Sausages

 Sakana especially popular with sake:
 Shiokara - fermented, salted squid innards etc.
 Roe
 Uni - Sea urchin roe
 Ikura - Red caviar (ikra)
 Mentaiko - spicy pollock roe
 Tarako - pollock roe
 Sujiko - salted salmon roe

 Small snacks:
 Atarime / Ika Ichiya-boshi - Dried squid
 Ei-hire - dried skate
 Seaweed
 Cheese
 Peanuts or other types of nuts (almonds, mixed nuts, etc.)
 Potato chips or fried potato sticks
 Arare - crackers made primarily from rice flour with other ingredients
 Tatami iwashi - small dried sardines pressed into a cracker-like square form

Examples

In media
Sakana are an everyday part of Japan's drinking culture. Japanese variety shows, magazines, and newspapers frequently feature recipes for homemade sakana.

There are numerous food manga and anime that focus on depicting sakana, some notable examples are:

 Shin'ya Shokudō is a long running food manga about the sakana the owner of a diner that is only open from midnight to dawn makes for his eccentric patrons. It has been made into a live action drama. Unlike a standard izakaya, the owner will prepare any food a customer requests if he has the ingredients.

 Takunomi is a 4-panel manga and anime focused on drinking at home. Each episode features a different drink, but due to Japanese drinking culture, multiple sakana and otsumami are shown being paired with each drink as alcohol is rarely drunk without a food pairing.

 Wakakozake is a manga and anime focused on the pleasure the main character gets from pairing the perfect sakana with a drink.

See also
 Aahaan kap klaem, Thai drinking food
Izakaya
 Snack bar
 Japanese cuisine
 Tapas
 Meze
 Anju (food)

Notes

References

Japanese cuisine